Molybdenum oxide may refer to:

 Molybdenum(IV) oxide (molybdenum dioxide)
 Molybdenum(VI) oxide (molybdenum trioxide)

References